Susan McCann (born 26 February 1949) is an Irish-born country and Irish singer. She had a 1977 hit "Big Tom is Still the King" which become a Number 1 in the Irish pop charts. Today, Mccann is affectionately known as 'Irelands First Lady Of Country Music'.

About
McCann has had enduring international popularity; she has recorded more than 650 songs across her career and toured around the world and performed at numerous prestigious venues including Carnegie Hall and Dollywood. McCann has had recording deals in South Africa and toured Russia, has been recording of over 40 years, and has sung for former US President George H. W. Bush and his son George W. Bush. Her 1977 hit "Big Tom is Still the King" become a number 1 hit on the Irish pop charts. She made her first appearance at the Grand Ole Opry in 1979, and won the European Star Award in 1980. She continue to release new albums, including "Through the Years," a compilation triple disc album in 2015. Susan sang in Aberdeen, Scotland for Cannon’s country music radio station. She cut the ribbon on the grand opening of the first country music store in Aberdeen, Scotland for Cannon’s country music. The concert at the Skean Dhu Hotel was a sell-out, with standing room only.

Albums

Sings Country (Top Spin Records) 1977
Down The River (Top Spin Records) 1978
Storybook Country (Top Spin Records) 1980
Sincerely Yours (Top Spin Records) 1981
At Home In Ireland (Homespun Records) 1985
When The Sun Says Goodbye To The Mountains (Top Spin Records) 1985
Songs Just For You (Homespun Records) 1986
You Gave Me Love (Gold Record Music) 1990
Diamond And Dreams (Prism Leisure) 1991
Memories (Prism Leisure) 1992
Part Of Me (Pegasus) 1998
Bring Me Sunshine (Prism Leisure) 2002
Sentimental Journey (H&H Music)
Once upon A Time (H&H Music) 2009
Ireland's First Lady Of Country Music (H&H Music) 2010
Through The Years (H&H Music) 2014
The Older I Get (H&H Music) 2020

Compilation Albums

Best Of (K-Tel) 1981
Very Best Of: 20 Golden Greats (Prism Leisure) 1998
Strings Of Diamonds (Prism Leisure) 1999
The Nightingale (Pegasus) 2003
My Heroes (Prism Leisure) 2005
The Blayney Years (H&H Music) 2006
The Nashvill Years (H&H Music) 2006
Great Songs Of Susan McCann & Brendan Quinn (Sharp Music) 2015
Susan McCann In Nashville (Ceol Music Ltd) 2015

DVDs
My Story In Words, Pictures And 40 Great Songs (2007)
40th Anniversary Edition: 40 Great Songs Plus Susan's Best Videos (2009) 
The Ultimate Collection (2014)

References

American women country singers
American country singer-songwriters
Irish country singers
Living people
1949 births
21st-century American women